The 2019 All Stars match was the eighth annual representative exhibition All Stars match of Australian rugby league. The match was played between the Indigenous All Stars and the Māori All Stars and for the first time, the match was played in Victoria's AAMI Park. The match was held on 15 February 2019.

Teams 

1 - Ryan James was originally selected to play but withdrew due to injury. Leilani Latu was moved from the bench to Prop and James was replaced by Josh Kerr.
2 - Ben Barba was originally selected to play but was withdrawn after his contract with the North Queensland Cowboys was terminated. Alex Johnston was moved from the bench to Fullback and Barba was replaced by Bevan French.
3 - Jordan McLean was originally selected to play but withdrew. James Tamou was moved from the bench to Prop and McLean was replaced by Kenny Bromwich.
4 - Tyrell Fuimaono was originally selected to play but withdrew. He was replaced by Craig Garvey.

Result

Women's All Stars match 
For the seventh time, a Women's All Stars match was held. The match, like the men's one will be held on 15 February 2019.

Teams

Result

References

All Stars Match
NRL All Stars match
Sports competitions in Melbourne
Rugby league in Victoria (Australia)